The Muhyiddin cabinet was formed on 10 March 2020, nine days after Muhyiddin Yassin was appointed as the 8th Prime Minister of Malaysia and dissolved  later on 16 August 2021, the day when Muhyiddin submitted his resignations as PM and of this cabinet. It was the 21st cabinet of Malaysia formed since independence. This cabinet was also known as the Perikatan Nasional Cabinet (PN-Cabinet) which combined 15 political parties from the Perikatan Nasional (PN) component parties, with Barisan Nasional (BN) component parties, Gabungan Parti Sarawak (GPS) component parties and United Sabah Party (PBS) as allied partners providing confidence and supply.

History 

Mahathir Mohamad resigned as Prime Minister on 24 February 2020, marking the end of the seventh Mahathir cabinet, where Muhyiddin was Minister of Home Affairs. A combination of factors, including Muhyiddin's decision to pull out his own party (BERSATU) out of the Pakatan Harapan (PH) coalition, the sacking of Mohamed Azmin Ali and Zuraida Kamaruddin from People's Justice Party (PKR) for initiating the "Sheraton Move" and the resignation of nine other Members of Parliament (MPs) aligned to Azmin from PKR, resulted in the ruling coalition losing a simple majority in the Dewan Rakyat, leaving itself hung. However, at the request of the Yang di-Pertuan Agong, Mahathir stayed on as interim Prime Minister until a new Prime Minister is appointed.

Following the leadership vacuum, the Yang di-Pertuan Agong summoned all MPs to the Istana Negara (National Palace) on 26 and 27 February to gauge their support for a new prime minister. PH initially wanted Mahathir to return, but later named Anwar Ibrahim to the post based on Mahathir's promise to pass the baton to Anwar before retracting the nomination for another time. The proposed return of Mahathir received cross community support from BERSATU, Barisan Nasional (BN), Malaysian Islamic Party (PAS), Sabah Heritage Party (WARISAN), Sarawak Parties Alliance (GPS) and other political parties represented in the Parliament. However, BN, PAS and GPS opposed the return of Democratic Action Party (DAP) to the governing coalition, the same way Mahathir opposed the return of "kleptocrats and traitors" to the same.

On 28 February, the National Palace stated that none of Prime Minister's candidates, namely Mahathir, Anwar, Muhyiddin or the self-nominated Bung Moktar Radin, obtained a simple majority in the Dewan Rakyat to form a government. Therefore, His Majesty gave another chance to leaders of all political parties represented in the Parliament to propose a new Prime Minister on the following day.

As a result, His Majesty has decided to appoint Muhyiddin as Prime Minister according to Articles 40(2)(a) and 43(2)(a) of the Federal Constitution following His Majesty's belief that Muhyiddin could command the majority of the Dewan Rakyat, Datuk Pengelola Bijaya Diraja (Comptroller of the National Palace) Ahmad Fadil Shamsuddin announced in a palace statement. According to PAS Secretary-General Takiyuddin Hassan, Muhyiddin was supported by 114 MPs representing BERSATU, BN, PAS, GBS and GPS. Sarawak Chief Minister Abang Johari Openg later announced that GPS is not a part of the newly created Perikatan Nasional (National Alliance) coalition but a party that provides confidence and supply to Muhyiddin.

Despite Mahathir's claim that he received support from 114 MPs to return to premiership at the night before Muhyiddin's swearing-in, Muhyiddin was sworn in as the eighth Prime Minister at 10.33 in the morning of 1 March.

On 8 July 2021, the UMNO made an official announcement to withdraw its supports towards the Muhyiddin government, citing the mismanagement of the COVID-19, the misuse of Emergency Declaration, and so on.

Composition 
On 9 March 2020, Muhyiddin announced his Cabinet of 32 ministers and 38 deputy ministers. The Cabinet includes six technocrats who was appointed as Senators on 10 March 2020 before taking office. The position of Deputy Prime Minister was kept vacant as "there is no need to appoint one". Instead, the Senior Ministers will deputise for the Prime Minister in his absence should such necessity arise.

Until July 2021, the post of Deputy Prime Minister was left vacant since Prime Minister Muhyiddin Yassin was appointed by the Yang di-Pertuan Agong on 1 March 2020 until he nominated Ismail Sabri Yaakob for this position on 7 July 2021. <onlyinclude>

On 16 August 2021, the Muhyiddin cabinet had dissolved after they handed in their resignation to His Majesty the Yang Di-Pertuan Agong.

Ministers 
 (14)
 (9)
 (4)
 (2)
 (1)

Deputy Ministers 
 (21)
 (13)
 (4)

Appointment with a ministerial rank

Changes 
Under this Cabinet:

Ministry of Agriculture and Agro-based Industry was renamed as Ministry of Agriculture and Food Industries.
Ministry of Economic Affairs was returned to the Prime Minister's Department in its original form as economic affairs portfolio.
A single Ministry of Education was divided into two separate ministries. Ministry of Higher Education was reinstated.
Ministry of Energy, Science, Technology, Environment and Climate Change and Ministry of Water, Land and Natural Resources were reorganised into three different ministries, namely Ministry of Energy and Natural Resources, Ministry of Science, Technology and Innovation and Ministry of Environment and Water.
Ministry of National Unity was established as a result of separation of national unity portfolio from the Prime Minister's Department.
Ministry of Primary Industries was renamed as Ministry of Plantation Industries and Commodities.

References

Cabinets established in 2020
2020 establishments in Malaysia
Government of Malaysia